Frank and Cindy is a comedy film written and directed by G.J. Echternkamp. The film stars Rene Russo, Oliver Platt, Johnny Simmons, Jane Levy, and Marc Maron and is based on the true story and the 2007 documentary of the same name. The film was released on 16 June 2015 in the United States.

Summary
G.J. Echternkamp tells the story of his relationship with his parents, his mother Cindy Brown (Russo) and his step-father Frank Garcia (Platt). Frank had been the bass player of OXO, a band from the '80s that scored with the one-hit wonder song "Whirly Girl". Cindy was the ultimate groupie who married Frank and thought life would be glamorous and filled with award shows, but that is not how it turned out. The movie includes a rearranged version of "Whirly Girl" and some excerpts from its video clip.

Cast
Rene Russo as Cindy Brown, Frank's wife
Oliver Platt as Frank Garcia, bassist for OXO
Johnny Simmons as GJ Echternkamp, Cindy's son
Jane Levy as Kate
Marc Maron as Gilbert
Jessica Garrison as Lizzie
Claire Titelman as Claire
Fabianne Therese as Melissa

Production
Writer and director G.J. Echternkamp is Cindy's real life son. He made the documentary Frank and Cindy in 2007 after filming his mother and step-father for a year.

Production on the film started in August 2013 with John Pierce, Scoot McNairy, Bill Perkins to produce.

References

External links

Frank Garcia Myspace page

2015 films
2015 comedy films
American films based on actual events
American comedy films
2010s English-language films
2010s American films